The 2008 Le Mans Series was the fifth season of ACO's Le Mans Series. It was a series for Le Mans Prototype and Grand Touring style cars broken into 4 classes: LMP1, LMP2, GT1, and GT2. It ran from 6 April to 14 September 2008 with five rounds taking place.

Schedule
The 2008 schedule remained largely unchanged from that of 2007, except for Circuit de Catalunya replacing Circuit de Valencia for the Spanish round. A large gap was built into the schedule between May and August to better allow teams to prepare for and recover from the 2008 24 Hours of Le Mans.

An additional race was announced at a later date, with a 1000 km event in Shanghai. This event however would not replace the Mil Milhas Brasil round, but was instead to be a stand-alone event as a precursor to a new Asian Le Mans Series planned for 2009. Points for the Le Mans Series would not be awarded but class winners would gain automatic entry to the 2009 24 Hours of Le Mans. The race was cancelled and was later rescheduled be held on 8 November 2009, because of conflicts with the 2008 Summer Olympics schedule.

Season results
Overall winners in bold.

Teams Championships
Points were awarded to the top eight finishers in the order of 10-8-6-5-4-3-2-1.  Unlike the American Le Mans Series, where teams with multiple entries scored the points of their highest finishing entry in each race, teams with multiple entries did not have their cars combined and each entry number was scored separately in the championship.  Cars which failed to complete 70% of the winner's distance were not awarded points.

The top two finishers in each team championship earned automatic entry to the 2009 24 Hours of Le Mans.

LMP1 Standings

LMP2 Standings

GT1 Standings

GT2 Standings

Drivers Championships
Points were awarded to the top 8 finishers in the order of 10-8-6-5-4-3-2-1.  Drivers who did not drive for at least 45 minutes do not receive points.

LMP1 Standings

LMP2 Standings

GT1 Standings

GT2 Standings

Confirmed entries

LMP1
 Oreca purchased Courage Compétition on 14 September 2007.  Oreca ran two Oreca-Courage LC70s in 2008, with Judd engines replacing AER units.  Olivier Panis was one of the team's drivers.
 Audi announced their intentions to run in the LMS in 2008, pending a marketing agreement for the series which Audi finds favorable.  The two-car team was run by Joest Racing.
 Epsilon Euskadi planned to enter two EE1 coupes in the 2008 season.
 Creation Autosportif was due to switch to new AIM-built engines in 2008, while also running two cars.
 On 10 January 2008, Aston Martin announced that it would be moving into the LMP1 category.  Using the same engine as the GT1-class DBR9, the prototype was a Lola B08/60 coupe.  Charouz Racing System ran the car with assistance from Prodrive, with drivers Tomáš Enge, Jan Charouz, and Stefan Mücke.
 Swiss Spirit, now under the control of Phoenix Racing, planned a return for their Audi-powered Lola.

LMP2
 Caspar Elgaard and John Nielsen formed Team Essex, running a Porsche RS Spyder in 2008.
 Van Merksteijn (VM) Motorsport entered an RS Spyder in the series, driven by Dutchmen Jeroen Bleekemolen, Peter van Merksteijn Sr. and Jos Verstappen.
 Swiss Horag Racing competed with an RS Spyder, with regular drivers Fredy Lienhard and Didier Theys.
 Welter Racing returned to the series with an all-new prototype.  The WR was powered by a Zytek V8 for the first time.
 On 23 October 2007, Pescarolo Sport merged with Saulnier Sport to form Pescarolo Automobiles.  Besides Pescarolo Sport's two-car LMP1 effort, Pescarolo Automobiles also had an LMP2 team run by Saulnier.
 Embassy Racing constructed their own cars in 2008, known as the Embassy WF01.  The cars will be powered by Zytek engines, and Warren Hughes, Jonny Kane and Joey Foster were to be drivers.
 Speed Racing Team and Sebah Automotive planned a joint campaign with a new Lola B08/80 under the Speedy Racing Team Sebah banner.
 Racing Box moved to LMP2 with the purchase of a Lucchini-Judd.

GT1
 Larbre Compétition were no longer be a factory-backed Aston Martin squad, instead moving to a pair of Oreca-supported Saleen S7-Rs.

GT2
 Spyker built new coupes (Laviolettes) for the GT2 class, both for their own team as well as replacements for the Speedy Racing Team.

References

External links

 Le Mans Series
 Mariantic - Le Mans Series 2008 News
 Endurance-Info (French)
 Planetlemans.com

 
European Le Mans Series seasons
European Le Mans Series
European Le Mans Series